On 22 May 2021, twenty-one professional runners died from hypothermia out of the 172 competing in a government-run  trail running race held in the Yellow River Stone Forest in Jingtai County, Gansu, China.

When the cold front struck, rain and possibly graupel were carried by gust reaching level 9. Many runners collapsed unconscious from hypothermia while reaching the  checkpoint. The organizers were unaware of the scope of the disaster because they did not assign any staff between checkpoints and they did not know the distressed point was in mobile phone signal blind spots. The collapsed runners did not survive and rescuers did not arrive until 19:00. The dead were from the lead pack due to the timing of the cold front, while the slower runners survived. The number of fatalities and the fatality rate surpassed the U.S.–China joint  in 1986 in Sichuan.

Background

Local government as the organizer

The race was jointly organized by Baiyin Prefecture's Sports Department and Jingtai County's  annually from 2018. The actual on-field event coordinator was the "Yellow River Stone Forest Administration", which is headed by the propaganda chief of Jingtai County's Communist Party Committee, who later committed suicide (see § Disciplinary action). The actual operator of the race was a local sports marketing company, Shengjing Sports Culture Development Ltd (甘肃晟景体育文化发展有限公司).

The Baiyin and Jingtai officials were later condemned by the official investigation for "being organizers only on paper" and not performing their duty to supervise as organizers. The on-field coordinators and some of the sports marketing company staff were later arrested.

Race rules
The 2021 edition consisted of three events:  running, a half marathon and a  trail running. Participants of the 100 km race had to show proof of completing a similar race of over 50 km within the last year. The race manual made windbreakers recommended but not compulsory.

The accident and the weather

Terrain and contingency planning

The  trail was set along Mijiashan Hill of the Yellow River Stone Forest, a treeless karst terrain at the transition from the Loess Plateau at its south to the Tengger Desert at the north. The terrain is mostly alluvial sandstone.

The most rugged and narrow section, i.e. the second and third checkpoints, were not car-accessible and required 1–2 hiking hours from the nearest roads in the best weather conditions. The event coordinator did not assign any staff or aid stations to the second and third checkpoints; worse still, the two checkpoints were largely mobile phone signal blind spots, which the coordinator did not know. This greatly hampered the efforts of the searchers and distressed trail runners who tried to report what had happened.

Runners' preparation of clothing

The night before the race, when the weather was pleasant, the organizer offered to collect runners' night supplies and to place them at the sixth checkpoint, to be picked up by the runners mid-race the next evening. In the three previous years the race was sunny and hot, so most runners handed away their windbreakers. The next day, they showed up wearing vests and shorts. While warming up at the starting line, they were concerned by the cloudy, windy weather.

However, the weather forecast the night before should have warned the organizers that it would not be a hot day as the previous three years had been. At 21:50 the night before, the city's meteorological center issued the lowest grade of a four-graded wind warning and stated, "in the upcoming 24 hours, in Baiyin, Jingtai, [...], the average windspeed will reach levels 5–6 and gust will reach levels 7 or above, accompanied by yellow dust and sand." The provincial meteorological center, at an unknown time on the day before, flagged a key notice that warned of "21–22 May is forecasted to have massive yellow dust and sand carried by winds, a drop of temperature and some precipitation. Atmospheric convection is getting strong in May in general, so beware of sudden heavy showers, hail, lightning and gusts."

The cold front strike mid-race

At 09:00 (Nationwide Beijing time) on Saturday 22 May 2021, the  trail running race began.

From 08:00, temperature dropped  within 5 hours, yet the gales accompanied with graupel and rain was a bigger issue. The average windspeed reached levels 6–7 and gust reached levels 8–9. These winds carried 3–5 mm of accumulated precipitation. While many runners reported sightings of hail and freezing rain, the investigation concluded it was most probably graupel because the weather conditions were impossible for the former two to exist.

Runners taking refuge behind rocks found their space blankets torn to pieces by winds. Some among the lead pack got lost near the summit at the third checkpoint because the presence of fog, trail marks being blown away, and hypothermia.

Errors in search and rescue

Within an hour

The operator of the race, which was a local sports marketing company, had equipped runners with GPS devices. The first distress message was sent at 11:50 (Nationwide Beijing time) by a runner via GPS, but never received a response. The first distress message received was sent via the official WeChat message group at 12:17, while a photo of ten runners hugging together was sent at 12:30. An ill-equipped private search team called Blue Sky Rescue (蓝天救援队), stationed at the starting line, sent some of its 39 members to the hill between the second and third checkpoints. By around 14:00, they guided 18 runners capable of walking on their own to a lodge at the foothill. After the accident, questions were raised about their qualifications.

The most timely rescue to those in critical medical condition came from a local shepherd, Zhu Keming (朱可铭). Around 13:00–14:00, while his sheep insisted on grazing in cold, windy, rainy weather at the Mijiashan Hill, he spotted the stricken runners, some already collapsed unconsciously from hypothermia. He saved six by bringing them to his heated yaodong cave. He later spotted three more runners dead not far from his cave.

The instruction given to the villagers
At 14:30, the Yellow River Stone Forest Administration phoned the mayor of Zhongquan town with a brief instruction, "we need to bring winter supplies to the athletes". This ambiguous instruction was delegated to the closest village at the foothill, Changsheng (常生村). Changsheng villagers did not learn of the urgency until 16:42 when shepherd Zhu Keming, who was taking refuge uphill, managed to get out of the mobile phone signal blind spot and phone to report that two runners had died. Villager Zhu Wanwen (朱万文), who had a motorbike, departed around 16:00 and he saved a mouth-foaming runner around 18:00–19:00. Sixty other able-bodied men from Changsheng, mostly around the age of 50, hiked up to the distressed third checkpoint by 20:00.

Firefighters arrived 9 hours later

At 15:34, a local phoned the Baiyin Prefecture Emergency Center. By this point, their job was largely a body-recovering mission. Although firefighters brought thermal-imaging drones and radar, they got lost in the dark a few times and relied on villagers' guidance. The villagers, who brought warm clothes and bedding with them, were more useful to the runners suffering hypothermia. The firefighters were not geared or trained to identify hypothermia, and did not attempt to perform CPR to the runners who "looked dead".

Timeline of fatalities
Twenty-one runners (eighteen men and three women) died, and a further eight were injured. All of the dead were in the lead pack. When the cold front arrived, the lead pack were near the summit at the third checkpoint and faced the wind in wide open; while the much slower runners, mostly female, missed the cold front. A female runner would have won the overall race had it not been suspended. Only four of the 172 runners made it to the fourth checkpoint. These four runners were way behind the lead pack, for instance, the first among the four arrived the second checkpoint at 11:09, while Liang Jing, the first of the six runners in the lead pack, arrived at 10:42.

Jing, a former champion and a record-holder, was among the casualties and recorded a zero heart rate at 13:08 by his sports watch. Also one of the victims was Huang Guanjun, a hearing-impaired marathon champion from China's 2019 National Paralympic Games.

Aftermath

Disciplinary action
Jingtai County's Communist Party Secretary, Li Zuobi (李作璧), the highest ranked in the county yet only middle ranked among the organizers, committed suicide on 9 June 2021.

The official investigation handed internal Communist Party disciplinary actions to 31 others, mostly in the form of demerit.

Public reaction
The deaths generated public anger, with most of the blame directed at the organizer, the local government. Questions were raised about the lack of contingency planning. The number of casualties and the death of some notable elite trail runners made international news headlines.

Impact on sporting events in China
On 2 June 2021, the Sports Administration of China suspended all high-risk sporting events that lack oversight bodies. This includes mountain and desert trail running, wingsuit flying, and ultra-long-distance races.

Other running races hit by cold weather
The Hong Kong Ultra-Trail World Tour in 2016 had its 100k finishing line at a summit hit by a  cold wave. Exhausted after a 100k race, runners were trapped for hours as all roads and even some of their clothes were covered in black ice.

Notes

References

External links

2021 meteorology
2021 disasters in China
Baiyin
Disasters in sports
Disasters in Gansu
May 2021 events in China
Mountain running competitions
Natural disasters in China
Sport deaths in China
Ultramarathons